Juvenile Law Center, founded in 1975, is a non-profit public interest law firm for children in the United States.

History

Juvenile Law Center was founded in Philadelphia, Pennsylvania, in 1975 by four Temple University Beasley School of Law graduates: Robert Schwartz, Marsha Levick, Judith Chomsky, and Philip Margolis.

Juvenile Law Center originally operated as a walk-in legal clinic for young people in Philadelphia with legal problems. It grew from a walk-in clinic to a statewide organization and has since grown to a national public interest law firm for children, filing its first brief in the United States Supreme Court in 1983.

Juvenile Law Center played a role in exposing the Luzerne County, Pennsylvania "kids-for-cash" scandal.

References

External links
 

Legal advocacy organizations in the United States
501(c)(3) organizations